Anatoly Georgievich Aleksin (original surname Goberman, ; 3 August 1924 in Moscow, Russian SFSR – 1 May 2017 in Luxembourg City, Luxembourg), was a Soviet, Russian and Israeli writer and poet.

In the late thirties Aleksin's poems were published in a children's newspaper, Pionerskaya Pravda. In 1950 he graduated from the Moscow Institute of Oriental Studies and his first novel Thirty one day (Тридцать один день) was published. He was a chairman of the Russian Federation Union of Writers from 1970 to 1989 and a member of the editorial board in of the literature journal Yunost. He also wrote the book titled "Secret of the Yellow House". Aleksin lived in Israel from 1993 until 2012. Then he moved to Luxembourg, where he lived until his death.

Bibliography
 А тем временем где-то - Meanwhile, somewhere
 Безумная Евдокия - Reckless Yevdokia (1976)
 Говорит седьмой этаж - Seventh floor speaking (1959)
 Дневник жениха - The diary of fiancé (1980)
 Домашний совет - Domestic council (1980)
 Звоните и приезжайте!- Call and Come in (1970)
 Ивашов - Ivashov (1980)
 Коля пишет Оле, Оля пишет Коле – Kolya writes to Olya, Olya writes to Kolya (1965)
 Мой брат играет на кларнете - My brother plays the clarinet
 Необычайные похождения Севы Котлова - Extraordinary adventures of Seva Kotlev (1958)
 Поздний ребенок - A late-born child (1968)
 Раздел имущества - The division of the property
 Саша и Шура - Sasha and Shura (1956)
 Сердечная недостаточность - Heart failure (1979)
 Третий в пятом ряду - The third in fifth row (1975)
 Здоровые и больные – Healthy and sick (1982)
 Очень страшная история – A very scary story

References

External links
 Anatoly Aleksin and Tatiana Aleksina. Official site
 

1924 births
2017 deaths
20th-century Russian male writers
21st-century Russian male writers
20th-century Israeli male writers
21st-century Israeli male writers
Communist Party of the Soviet Union members
Corresponding Members of the USSR Academy of Pedagogical Sciences
Academic staff of High Courses for Scriptwriters and Film Directors
Recipients of the Lenin Komsomol Prize
Recipients of the Order of Lenin
Recipients of the Order of the Red Banner of Labour
Recipients of the USSR State Prize
Russian emigrants to Israel
Soviet children's writers
Soviet male writers

Burials at Kuntsevo Cemetery
Moscow Institute of Oriental Studies alumni